Brachinus is a genus of ground beetle native to the Nearctic, Palearctic, the Near East and North Africa. Beetles in this genus are commonly referred to as bombardier beetles. The genus contains the following species:

 Brachinus aabaaba Erwin, 1970
 Brachinus abbreviatus (Laporte, 1835)
 Brachinus abyssinicus Chaudoir, 1876
 Brachinus adustipennis Erwin, 1969
 Brachinus aeger Chaudoir, 1876
 Brachinus aeneicostis Bates, 1883
 Brachinus afghanus Jedlicka, 1967
 Brachinus agraphus (Alluaud, 1899)
 Brachinus albarracinus Wagner, 1926
 Brachinus alexandri F.Battoni, 1984
 Brachinus alexiguus Erwin, 1970
 Brachinus algoensis Péringuey, 1896
 Brachinus alternans Dejean, 1825
 Brachinus americanus (LeConte, 1844)
 Brachinus andalusiacus Rambur, 1837
 Brachinus andamanensis Tian & Deuve, 2015
 Brachinus andreaei Basilewsky, 1964
 Brachinus angustatus (Dejean, 1831)
 Brachinus ankarensis Jedlicka, 1962
 Brachinus annulicornis Chaudoir, 1842
 Brachinus apicalis Erichson, 1843
 Brachinus arboreus Chevrolat, 1834
 Brachinus aristokrates Liebke, 1934
 Brachinus armiger Dejean, 1831
 Brachinus atramentarius Mannerheim, 1837
 Brachinus atripensis Ballion, 1871
 Brachinus azureipennis Chaudoir, 1876
 Brachinus bagdatensis Pic, 1902
 Brachinus bantimurungensis Kirschenhofer, 2012
 Brachinus barbarus Lucas, 1846
 Brachinus barclayi Hrdlicka, 2019
 Brachinus barthei Mateu, 1958
 Brachinus batuensis Kirschenhofer, 2011
 Brachinus bayardi Dejean, 1831
 Brachinus bellicosus L.Dufour, 1820
 Brachinus belyaevae Fedorenko, 2013
 Brachinus bendanilloi Lassalle & Schnell, 2018
 Brachinus berytensis Reiche & Saulcy, 1855
 Brachinus bigutticeps Chaudoir, 1876
 Brachinus bilineatus Laporte, 1835
 Brachinus bipustulatus Quensel, 1806
 Brachinus bodemeyeri Apfelbeck, 1904
 Brachinus boeticus Rambur, 1837
 Brachinus bolovenensis Hrdlicka, 2009
 Brachinus brevicollis Motschulsky, 1844
 Brachinus brittoni Ali, 1967
 Brachinus bruchi Liebke, 1939
 Brachinus brunneus Laporte, 1834
 Brachinus caffer Boheman, 1848
 Brachinus cambodgensis Kirschenhofer, 2012
 Brachinus canaliculatus Fairmaire, 1897
 Brachinus capnicus Erwin, 1970
 Brachinus catalonicus Jeanne, 1988
 Brachinus chalchihuitlicue Erwin, 1970
 Brachinus charis Andrewes, 1923
 Brachinus chaudoirianus Jakobson, 1908
 Brachinus chinensis Chaudoir, 1850
 Brachinus chirriador Erwin, 1970
 Brachinus cibolensis Erwin, 1970
 Brachinus ciliatus Liebke, 1933
 Brachinus cinctellus Chaudoir, 1876
 Brachinus cinctipennis Chevrolat, 1835
 Brachinus circumtinctus Bates, 1892
 Brachinus collarti Basilewsky, 1948
 Brachinus conformis Dejean, 1831
 Brachinus congicus (Basilewsky, 1958)
 Brachinus connectoides (Jeannel, 1949)
 Brachinus connectus Dejean, 1831
 Brachinus consanguineus Chaudoir, 1876
 Brachinus constrictus Reitter, 1919
 Brachinus cordicollis Dejean, 1826
 Brachinus costatulus Motschulsky, 1844
 Brachinus costiger Chaudoir, 1876
 Brachinus costipennis Motschulsky, 1859
 Brachinus costulipennis Liebke, 1928
 Brachinus crepitans (Linnaeus, 1758)  (Bombadier Beetle)
 Brachinus cruciatus (Quensel, 1806)
 Brachinus cyanipennis Say, 1823
 Brachinus cyanochroaticus Erwin, 1969
 Brachinus cychroides Hrdlicka, 2009
 Brachinus dalatensis Fedorenko, 2013
 Brachinus daliensis Kirschenhofer, 2011
 Brachinus dawnaensis Kirschenhofer, 2003
 Brachinus demoulini Basilewsky, 1962
 Brachinus deuvei Gao & Tian, 2011
 Brachinus devagiriensis Akhil; Divya & Sabu, 2020
 Brachinus dieganus (Jeannel, 1949)
 Brachinus diffusus Chaudoir, 1876
 Brachinus dilapsus Antoine, 1941
 Brachinus dilatatus Klug, 1832
 Brachinus dilatipennis Reitter, 1919
 Brachinus dilottii Maran, 1933
 Brachinus dissimilis (Basilewsky, 1943)
 Brachinus distans Lorenz, 1998
 Brachinus dorsalis Dejean, 1831
 Brachinus drumonti Tian & Deuve, 2015
 Brachinus dryas Andrewes, 1936
 Brachinus efflans Dejean, 1830
 Brachinus ejaculans Fischer von Waldheim, 1828
 Brachinus elegans Chaudoir, 1842
 Brachinus elegantulus Erichson, 1842
 Brachinus elongatulus Chaudoir, 1876
 Brachinus enonensis Péringuey, 1898
 Brachinus eucosmus Andrewes, 1937
 Brachinus evanescens Bates, 1892
 Brachinus exhalans (P.Rossi, 1792)
 Brachinus explodens Duftschmid, 1812
 Brachinus explosus Erwin, 1970
 Brachinus exquisitus Bates, 1892
 Brachinus fageli Basilewsky, 1962
 Brachinus fasciatocollis (Fairmaire, 1901)
 Brachinus favicollis Erwin, 1965
 Brachinus flavicapillus Bates, 1892
 Brachinus flavipes Gao & Tian, 2011
 Brachinus flavithorax Tian & Deuve, 2015
 Brachinus flaviventris Chaudoir, 1876
 Brachinus flavus Jedlicka, 1955
 Brachinus flores Kirschenhofer, 2011
 Brachinus floresensis Hrdlicka, 2017
 Brachinus foochowi Kirschenhofer, 1986
 Brachinus formosanus Jedlicka, 1939
 Brachinus forticostis Liebke, 1934
 Brachinus frontalis Chaudoir, 1883
 Brachinus fukienensis Hrdlicka, 2009
 Brachinus fulminatus Erwin, 1969
 Brachinus fulvipennis Chaudoir, 1876
 Brachinus fumans (Fabricius, 1781)
 Brachinus fuscicornis Dejean, 1826
 Brachinus fuscipennis Dejean, 1825
 Brachinus galactoderus Erwin, 1970
 Brachinus garnerae Hrdlicka, 2019
 Brachinus gebhardis Erwin, 1965
 Brachinus geiseri Hrdlicka, 2019
 Brachinus genicularis Mannerheim, 1837
 Brachinus geniculatus Dejean, 1831
 Brachinus gentilis Erichson, 1843
 Brachinus ghindanus Liebke, 1934
 Brachinus grandis Brullé, 1838
 Brachinus grootaerti Tian & Deuve, 2013
 Brachinus guangdongensis Tian & Deuve, 2015
 Brachinus hajeki Hrdlicka, 2017
 Brachinus hamatus Fischer von Waldheim, 1828
 Brachinus havai Hrdlicka, 2016
 Brachinus hazardi Andrewes, 1930
 Brachinus hexagrammus Chaudoir, 1876
 Brachinus hirsutus Bates, 1884
 Brachinus hoffmanni Liebke, 1927
 Brachinus hubeiensis Hrdlicka, 2009
 Brachinus humeralis Ahrens, 1812
 Brachinus hunanensis Kirschenhofer, 2011
 Brachinus hylaenus Reichardt, 1967
 Brachinus ichabodopsis Erwin, 1970
 Brachinus illotus Chaudoir, 1876
 Brachinus immaculicornis Dejean, 1826
 Brachinus immarginatus Brullé, 1838
 Brachinus imperialensis Erwin, 1965
 Brachinus imporcitis Erwin, 1970
 Brachinus incomptus Bates, 1873
 Brachinus inconditus Péringuey, 1896
 Brachinus inops Andrewes, 1932
 Brachinus intactus Bates, 1892
 Brachinus intermedius Brullé, 1838
 Brachinus irakus Liebke, 1933
 Brachinus italicus (Dejean, 1831)
 Brachinus jakli Hrdlicka, 2009
 Brachinus janthinipennis (Dejean, 1831)
 Brachinus javalinopsis Erwin, 1970
 Brachinus johorensis Kirschenhofer, 2012
 Brachinus jucundus Dejean, 1831
 Brachinus kalalovae Roubal, 1932
 Brachinus kansanus LeConte, 1863
 Brachinus kavanaughi Erwin, 1969
 Brachinus knirschi Jedlicka, 1931
 Brachinus kollari Liebke, 1934
 Brachinus krynickii Hrdlicka in Löbl & Smetana, 2003
 Brachinus kryzhanovskii Belousov & Kabak, 1992
 Brachinus laetus Dejean, 1831
 Brachinus laevicostis Liebke, 1934
 Brachinus langenhani Liebke, 1934
 Brachinus lapidarius Basilewsky, 1962
 Brachinus lateralis Dejean, 1831
 Brachinus latipennis Peyerimhoff, 1907
 Brachinus latus Lorenz, 1998
 Brachinus lavaudeni (Jeannel, 1949)
 Brachinus leprieuri Gory, 1833
 Brachinus lesnei Andrewes, 1923
 Brachinus lethierryi Reiche, 1868
 Brachinus lewecki Liebke, 1928
 Brachinus lewisii Bates, 1873
 Brachinus leytensis Lassalle & Schnell, 2018
 Brachinus limbellus Chaudoir, 1876
 Brachinus limbicollis Chaudoir, 1876
 Brachinus limbiger Chaudoir, 1876
 Brachinus lombokensis Kirschenhofer, 2010
 Brachinus longipalpis Wiedemann, 1821
 Brachinus longulus Chaudoir, 1876
 Brachinus luzonicus Chaudoir, 1876
 Brachinus macrocerus Chaudoir, 1876
 Brachinus mactus Péringuey, 1904
 Brachinus madecassus (Jeannel, 1949)
 Brachinus magyari Jedlicka, 1960
 Brachinus mansorii Azadbakhsh & Kirschenhofer, 2018
 Brachinus marginellus Dejean, 1826
 Brachinus marginiventris Brullé, 1838
 Brachinus marleyi Barker, 1919
 Brachinus mauretanicus Bedel, 1914
 Brachinus medius T.W.Harris, 1828
 Brachinus melanarthrus Chaudoir, 1876
 Brachinus melancholicus Schmidt-Goebel, 1846
 Brachinus meratusensis Hrdlicka, 2017
 Brachinus merkli Kirschenhofer, 2003
 Brachinus mesopotamicus Ali, 1967
 Brachinus methneri Liebke, 1934
 Brachinus mexicanus Dejean, 1831
 Brachinus micheli (Jeannel, 1949)
 Brachinus microamericanus Erwin, 1969
 Brachinus microrrhabdus (Alluaud, 1899)
 Brachinus midoli Alluaud, 1917
 Brachinus mindanaoensis Tian & Deuve, 2013
 Brachinus minor Jedlicka, 1958
 Brachinus mobilis Erwin, 1970
 Brachinus modestus Schmidt-Goebel, 1846
 Brachinus motschulskyi Hrdlicka in Löbl & Smetana, 2003
 Brachinus muchei Jedlicka, 1967
 Brachinus natalicus Péringuey, 1896
 Brachinus neglectus LeConte, 1844
 Brachinus ngoclinhensis Hrdlicka, 2017
 Brachinus niger Chaudoir, 1876
 Brachinus nigricans Chaudoir, 1850
 Brachinus nigricornis Gebler, 1830
 Brachinus nigridorsis Nakane, 1962
 Brachinus nigripes G.R.Waterhouse, 1841
 Brachinus nigrovirescens Basilewsky, 1951
 Brachinus nobilis Dejean, 1831
 Brachinus nuristanus Jedlicka, 1967
 Brachinus oaxacensis Erwin, 1970
 Brachinus obliquetruncatus Perris, 1875
 Brachinus obliterus Péringuey, 1896
 Brachinus oblongus Dejean, 1825
 Brachinus obtusus (Thunberg, 1784)
 Brachinus olgae Arribas, 1993
 Brachinus olidus Reiche, 1843
 Brachinus oneili Péringuey, 1898
 Brachinus opacipennis Motschulsky, 1864
 Brachinus orestes Kirschenhofer, 2003
 Brachinus orientalis Chaudoir, 1876
 Brachinus ornatus Fairmaire, 1901
 Brachinus otini Antoine, 1963
 Brachinus ovalipennis Fedorenko, 2013
 Brachinus ovipennis LeConte, 1863
 Brachinus oxygonus Chaudoir, 1843
 Brachinus pachygaster Perty, 1830
 Brachinus palawanensis Tian & Deuve, 2013
 Brachinus pallidipes Reitter, 1919
 Brachinus pallidus Erwin, 1965
 Brachinus pallipes Dejean, 1826
 Brachinus papua Darlington, 1968
 Brachinus pateri Puel, 1938
 Brachinus patruelis LeConte, 1844
 Brachinus paviei Lesne, 1896
 Brachinus pecoudi Puel, 1925
 Brachinus pectoralis Dejean, 1825
 Brachinus pelengensis Hrdlicka, 2009
 Brachinus peltastes Andrewes, 1931
 Brachinus perplexus Dejean, 1831
 Brachinus perrieri (Jeannel, 1949)
 Brachinus phaeocerus Chaudoir, 1868
 Brachinus philippinensis Tian & Deuve, 2007
 Brachinus piceus Chaudoir, 1876
 Brachinus pictus (Hope, 1833)
 Brachinus plagiatus Reiche, 1868
 Brachinus pokharaensis Kirschenhofer, 2012
 Brachinus posticus Dejean, 1831
 Brachinus praestans Andrewes, 1931
 Brachinus promontorii Péringuey, 1888
 Brachinus proximus Fairmaire, 1887
 Brachinus pseudocruciatus Reitter, 1909
 Brachinus psophia Audinet-Serville, 1821
 Brachinus puberulus Chaudoir, 1868
 Brachinus punctaticollis Heller, 1923
 Brachinus puncticollis Schmidt-Goebel, 1846
 Brachinus pygmaeus (Dejean, 1826)
 Brachinus quadriguttatus Gebler, 1830
 Brachinus quadripennis Dejean, 1825
 Brachinus reyi Andrewes, 1924
 Brachinus rikatlae Péringuey, 1896
 Brachinus rugipennis Chaudoir, 1868
 Brachinus sallei Chaudoir, 1876
 Brachinus sanchi Azadbakhsh & Kirschenhofer, 2018
 Brachinus schmidti Andrewes, 1927
 Brachinus scitulus Schmidt-Goebel, 1846
 Brachinus sclopeta (Fabricius, 1792)
 Brachinus scotomedes L.Redtenbacher, 1868
 Brachinus scotti Liebke, 1934
 Brachinus scriptus Chaudoir, 1878
 Brachinus scutellatus Chaudoir, 1876
 Brachinus sericeus Dejean, 1831
 Brachinus servillei Marc, 1839
 Brachinus sexmaculatus Dejean, 1825
 Brachinus sexnotatus Liebke, 1934
 Brachinus sexpustulatus (Fabricius, 1775)
 Brachinus seyrigi (Alluaud, 1935)
 Brachinus sicardi Jeannel, 1949
 Brachinus sichemita Reiche & Saulcy, 1855
 Brachinus simulans Péringuey, 1896
 Brachinus solidipalpis Tian & Deuve, 2007
 Brachinus solidus Péringuey, 1898
 Brachinus somereni Burgeon, 1947
 Brachinus sonorous Erwin, 1970
 Brachinus sordidus Andrewes, 1933
 Brachinus stappersi Liebke, 1934
 Brachinus stenoderus Bates, 1873
 Brachinus stevensi Andrewes, 1924
 Brachinus stevensianus Jedlicka, 1956
 Brachinus stygius Andrewes, 1933
 Brachinus subcostatus Dejean, 1825
 Brachinus suberbianus Alluaud, 1935
 Brachinus sublaevis Chaudoir, 1868
 Brachinus subnotatus Chaudoir, 1844
 Brachinus suensoni Kirschenhofer, 1986
 Brachinus sulcipennis (Jeannel, 1949)
 Brachinus sumbawanus Hrdlicka, 2017
 Brachinus suturalis (Jeannel, 1949)
 Brachinus suturatus Chaudoir, 1876
 Brachinus suturellus Chaudoir, 1876
 Brachinus szetschuanensis Jedlicka, 1964
 Brachinus talyschensis Motschulsky, 1850
 Brachinus tenuicollis LeConte, 1844
 Brachinus tenuis Lorenz, 1998
 Brachinus testaceus Rambur, 1837
 Brachinus tetracolon Chaudoir, 1876
 Brachinus tetragrammus Chaudoir, 1876
 Brachinus tetraspilotus Chaudoir, 1876
 Brachinus tetrastigma Fairmaire, 1897
 Brachinus texanus Chaudoir, 1868
 Brachinus tianshanicus Mikhailov, 1976
 Brachinus tigridis Ali, 1967
 Brachinus timorensis Hrdlicka, 2017
 Brachinus truncatulus Fairmaire, 1901
 Brachinus tsara Alluaud, 1918
 Brachinus turkestanicus Liebke, 1928
 Brachinus turnai Hrdlicka, 2009
 Brachinus vadoni Jeannel, 1949
 Brachinus vagus Péringuey, 1898
 Brachinus variegatus (Roth, 1851)
 Brachinus variventris L.Schaufuss, 1862
 Brachinus velutinus Erwin, 1965
 Brachinus vicinus Dejean, 1826
 Brachinus vigilans Chaudoir, 1876
 Brachinus viridipennis Dejean, 1831
 Brachinus vitticollis Chaudoir, 1876
 Brachinus votrubai Hrdlicka, 2009
 Brachinus vulcanoides Erwin, 1969
 Brachinus xanthophryus Chaudoir, 1876
 Brachinus xanthopleurus Chaudoir, 1876
 Brachinus yunnanus Jedlicka, 1964
 † Brachinus newberryi Scudder, 1900
 † Brachinus primordialis Heer, 1847
 † Brachinus repressus Scudder, 1900

References

External links

Brachinus at Fauna Europaea

Brachininae
Carabidae genera